Barbeau is a surname of French origin. The name refers to:
Adrienne Barbeau (b. 1945), American stage, film, and television actress
André Barbeau (1931–1986), French-Canadian neurologist and researcher into Parkinson's disease
Anton Barbeau (contemporary), American singer and songwriter
Clayton Barbeau (1930-2019), American author, public speaker and therapist
Jap Barbeau (1882–1969), American professional baseball player
Manon Barbeau (contemporary), Canadian film director and screenwriter
Marcel Barbeau (1925–2016), Canadian artist
Marius Barbeau (1883–1969), Canadian ethnographer and folklorist
Raymond Barbeau (1930–1992), French-Canadian essayist, literary critic, and naturopath
Victor Barbeau (1896–1994), Québécois writer and academic

French-language surnames